The pisohamate ligament is a ligament in the hand. It connects the pisiform to the hook of the hamate. It is a prolongation of the tendon of the flexor carpi ulnaris.

It serves as part of the origin for the abductor digiti minimi. It also forms the floor of the ulnar canal, a canal that allows the ulnar nerve and ulnar artery into the hand.

References 

Ligaments of the upper limb